Nukusavalevale is an islet of Funafuti, Tuvalu. It lies on the southeastern rim of the atoll, south of Motuloa.

References

Islands of Tuvalu
Pacific islands claimed under the Guano Islands Act
Funafuti